is a Japanese castle in Usuki, Ōita Prefecture, Japan.

History
This castle was constructed by Ōtomo Sōrin in 1562 on the island Nyū-jima, in Usuki Bay as his head castle. During the 1560s, Sōrin had the largest territory in Kyūshū. However, after defeat at the Battle of Mimikawa in 1578, the power of Sōrin and the Ōtomo clan rapidly declined. In 1586, this castle fell to Shimazu Yoshihiro, a daimyō of Kagoshima, but was rescued by Toyotomi Hideyoshi.

Access
Usuki Station on the Nippō Main Line

Literature

References
Usuki Castle page on Usuki City home page (Japanese)
Japanese version of Wikipedia

Literature 

Castles in Ōita Prefecture